The 1984 RTHK Top 10 Gold Songs Awards was held in 1984 for the 1983 music season.

Top 10 song awards
The top 10 songs (十大中文金曲) of 1984 are as follows.

Other awards

References
 RTHK top 10 gold song awards 1984

RTHK Top 10 Gold Songs Awards
Rthk Top 10 Gold Songs Awards, 1984
Rthk Top 10 Gold Songs Awards, 1984